This article details the qualifying phase for surfing at the 2024 Summer Olympics. The competition at these Games will comprise a total of 48 surfers coming from their respective NOCs with a maximum of two to three per gender. All athletes must undergo a qualifying pathway to earn a spot for the Games through three successive editions of the ISA World Surfing Games, the World Surf League Championship Tour, and the Pan American Games. 

Host nation France has been entitled to use a single quota place each in both men's and women's shortboards. If one or more French surfers directly qualify through any of the tournaments, the host country place(s) shall be reallocated to the next highest-ranked eligible surfer at the 2024 ISA World Surfing Games. For the first time, the International Olympic Committee invites all interested and eligible NOCs to send surfers to the Games under the Universality rule. To be registered for a spot granted by the Universality principle, an eligible surfer must finish among the top 50 in his or her respective shortboard event at the 2023 or 2024 ISA World Surfing Games.

Summary
Quota places will be distributed to the eligible surfers at the following events based on the hierarchical structure:
 Host country – As the host country, France reserves one quota place each for the men's and women's shortboard events. If one or more French surfers qualify regularly and directly, their slots will be reallocated to the next highest-ranked eligible surfers from the 2024 ISA World Surfing Games. 
 2022 ISA World Surfing Games –  The winning teams by gender will secure one place for their respective NOC, regardless of the two-per-country quota limit.
 2023 World Surf League Championship Tour – The top ten men and top eight women eligible for qualification will each be awarded a quota place. 
 2023 Pan American Games – The gold medalist of each shortboard event will be entitled to a spot for the Olympics; otherwise, it will be reallocated to the next highest-ranked surfer in the same tournament.
 2023 ISA World Surfing Games – The highest-ranked eligible male and female surfer from each continent will be entitled to a spot for the Olympics; otherwise, it will be reallocated to the next highest-ranked surfer on the continent.
 2024 ISA World Surfing Games
 The winning teams by gender will secure one place for their respective NOC, regardless of the two-per-country quota limit.
 The top five men and top seven women eligible for qualification will each be awarded a quota place.
 Universality place – For the first time, an additional place per gender will be entitled to eligible NOCs interested to have their surfers compete in Paris 2024. To be registered for a spot granted by the Universality principle, the athlete must finish among the top 50 in his or her respective shortboard event at the 2023 or 2024 ISA World Surfing Games.

Qualified countries

Timeline

Events

Men's shortboard

Women's shortboard

References

Qualification for the 2024 Summer Olympics
Qualification
Olympics qualification
Olympics qualification
Olympics qualification